Seasons of Love (also known as Love on the Land in Canada) is a four-hour Canadian television miniseries based on the novel The Earth Abideth by George Dell. The two part miniseries, produced for CBS by Sullivan Entertainment, was first broadcast in the US on March 7 and 9, 1999, under the title Seasons of Love. In Canada, it was broadcast on television and released on home video under the title Love on the Land. The film, directed by Daniel Petrie and starring Peter Strauss, Rachel Ward, Rip Torn and Hume Cronyn, was shot in Toronto and at Upper Canada Village near Morrisburg, Ontario.

SynopsisLove on the Land'' spans forty years in the lives of Thomas Linthorne and his wife Kate as they endure trials and tribulations while raising their family in rural Ohio after the Civil War. Thomas acquires a large piece of land and goes on a search for the woman of his dreams. He rescues Kate from an abusive relationship, and they develop a strong love for one another. Kate is unaware of the threat standing before her when a beautiful married woman moves in next door.

Cast list
 Peter Strauss – Thomas Linthorne
 Rachel Ward – Kate Linthorne
 Hume Cronyn – Lonzo Brewster
 Rip Torn – Spence Vitt
 Nick Stahl – Grover Linthorne
 Justin Chambers – Hocking Linthorne
 Chandra West – Lucille Brewster

References

External links
Sullivanmovies.com - Official Seasons of Love Page

1990s Canadian television miniseries
1999 Canadian television series debuts
CBC Television original programming
Films directed by Daniel Petrie
Television shows set in Ohio